The Cilicia Peace Treaty (March 9, 1921) was signed in London between France and the Turkish National Movement based in Angora to end the fighting in the Franco-Turkish War. 

The signatories were French foreign minister Aristide Briand and Turkish foreign minister Bekir Sami Bey. However, the treaty did not achieve the intended goals. It was subsequently replaced with the Treaty of Ankara.

References

External links
 Cilicia Peace Treaty

World War I treaties
1921 in France
Franco-Turkish War
1921 in the Ottoman Empire
Treaties concluded in 1921
Peace treaties of Turkey
Peace treaties of France
Treaties of the French Third Republic
Treaties of the Turkish War of Independence